A halftime show is a performance given during the brief period between the first and second halves, or the second and third quarters, of a sporting event.  Halftime shows are not given for sports with an irregular or indeterminate number of divisions (such as baseball or boxing), or for sports that do not have an extended period of stoppage in play. Ice hockey games consist of three periods, so there are in effect two halftimes at a hockey game: the first intermission is between the first and second periods, and the second intermission comes between the second and third periods. The intermissions are usually given over to contests involving randomly selected audience members, although for major games, like the Winter Classic, the Stanley Cup Finals, the NHL All-Star Game and the Frozen Four, the intermission between the 2nd and 3rd period often features entertainment typically found during halftime shows.

The invention of the halftime show is generally credited to Walter Lingo. Lingo was the owner of a dog kennel and sponsored an all-Native American football team, the Oorang Indians, to tour the country and promote the kennel. In addition to playing football, the Indians would provide various forms of entertainment, including exhibiting the dogs, players demonstrating their prowess (Nick Lassa once wrestled a bear while Jim Thorpe would kick long-distance field goals), dancing, and demonstrations of native culture. Although the halftime show was in part designed to bring an additional draw to mask the fact that the Indians did not put much effort into the actual game, his halftime show was mostly the same from game to game, and the novelty wore off after two years.

A modern halftime show can consist of cheerleading performances, majorette routines, marching bands playing music, or other spectacular performances. Halftime shows are particularly well known among historically black colleges and universities, which have elaborate "battles of the bands" between the opposing schools' marching bands during halftimes of the most prominent games (see, for instance, the Bayou Classic). More common in modern times, especially in major games, is to reserve the entire halftime period for a short concert by a major recording artist.

Gridiron football 

A halftime show is a traditional element in an American football and Canadian football game. During the interval between the second and third quarters (normally 20 minutes) some form of entertainment is presented on the field. The entertainment frequently consists of performances by marching bands.

At high school and most college games, the school bands of the two competing teams perform at halftime. Often, the cheerleaders and/or a dance team will perform. Other activities may also take place, and these vary widely.  Until sometime in the early 1980s, these shows were typically included as part of the broadcast if the game was televised; since that time, it has become traditional for TV networks to devote the halftime to a roundup of other games' scores.

During a professional football game, a high school or college band may be brought in to perform. For the Super Bowl and Grey Cup games, an elaborate show involving world-renowned music stars, dancers, fireworks and other special effects has become the norm. High-profile acts are generally chosen for their broad appeal, due to the games' large audiences, and choices that deviate from that tend to be poorly received.

Many football historians believe halftime shows originated with the Oorang Indians of the early National Football League. The team was a marketing ploy by Walter Lingo to sell and promote his airdales. He would lure audiences to his games with the promise of an outrageous halftime show, instead of the promise of a good football game. The team was called the Indians because they were made up entirely of Native Americans, and Oorang came from Lingo's Oorang Kennel Company. The Indians players participated in helping the Oorang Airedales perform tricks for the crowd before and after the game. However, it was their halftime entertainment that made them such a huge attraction in the early 1920s. There were shooting exhibitions with the dogs retrieving the targets. There were Native American dances and tomahawk and knife-throwing demonstrations. Indians player Nick Lassa, also called "Long-Time-Sleep", even wrestled a bear on occasion. Another show was a demonstration of the United States Indian scouts actions during World War I. The show promoted Lingo's kennels by showing the Airedale Red Cross dogs administering first aid to wound soldier. Many of the scouts and Red Cross dogs taking part in the event were real veterans of the war, while the German troops were impersonated by local American Legion men who wore German uniforms furnished by Lingo. The halftime activities soon became more important than the results of the game for the Indians fanbase. The Indians only won 3 games in their two seasons of existence.

Super Bowl 

In the United States, the halftime show for the Super Bowl is the highlight of the event and can cost millions to stage.

On February 1, 2004, the live halftime show for Super Bowl XXXVIII, produced by music video giant MTV, sparked outrage among many viewers when Justin Timberlake, one of the performers, exposed fellow performer Janet Jackson's right breast  in what was later dubbed a "wardrobe malfunction".  Since it was broadcast live, the exposure was seen by millions when it happened.

Grey Cup 

In Canada, the halftime show for the Grey Cup is a highlight of the event and can cost millions to stage. Performers over the years have included Justin Bieber, Black Eyed Peas, and Imagine Dragons.

Rugby football 
A halftime show is a traditional element in a Rugby league and Rugby union game during a Grand final.

See also 
Seventh-inning stretch
List of Super Bowl halftime shows
List of Grey Cup halftime shows
Tifo
Card stunts
The Cricket Show

References

External links 

The Super Bowl Entertainment gives a list of all past pregame, anthem, cointoss, and halftime shows at the Super Bowl, with the producer, the theme and the talent featured in each one.
Statement regarding the Super Bowl halftime show How NFL Commissioner Paul Tagliabue feels about the Super Bowl XXXVIII halftime show controversy
Ohio History Central: Walter Lingo

Terminology used in multiple sports
Articles containing video clips